The El Segundo blue (Euphilotes battoides allyni) is a rare subspecies of the square-spotted blue butterfly. It is endemic to a small dune ecosystem in Southern California that used to be a community called Palisades del Rey, close to the Los Angeles International Airport (LAX). In 1976 it became a federally designated endangered species. This butterfly’s habitat has been substantially reduced due to urban development and invasive plants, and it now exists as a handful of populations restricted to coastal dunes in the vicinity of Los Angeles.

The El Segundo Blue Butterfly Habitat Preserve next to LAX exists to protect the subspecies. Until 2013, there are only three colonies of this tiny butterfly still in existence.  The largest of these is on the grounds of LAX; a further colony exists on a site within the huge Chevron El Segundo oil refinery complex, and the smallest colony is an area of only a few square yards on a local beach. In 2013, the El Segundo blue was discovered living and breeding in the Ballona Wetlands, and its range now extends south to the Palos Verdes Peninsula and some have been located in Santa Barbara County. The butterfly lays its eggs on coast buckwheat, which the adults also use as a nectar source.  Recently, some nearby beach cities such as Redondo Beach have replaced ice plant growth near the beaches with coast buckwheat, in order to provide the butterflies with more of their natural food source.

Population
There are about 750,000 El Segundo Blues per year.

See also
 Palos Verdes blue

References

Further reading
 Mattoni, Rudolf H. T., "The Endangered El Segundo Blue Butterfly," The Journal of Research on the Lepidoptera, Volume 29 (4), Winter 1990. PDF 19.5 MB (archive.org)

Euphilotes
Endemic fauna of California
ESA endangered species
Butterfly subspecies